Trongsa, previously Tongsa, is a Thromde or town, and the capital of Trongsa District in central Bhutan. The name means "new village" in Dzongkha. The first temple was built in 1543 by the Drukpa lama Ngagi Wangchuck, who was the great-grandfather of Ngawang Namgyal, Zhabdrung Rinpoche, the unifier of Bhutan.

Trongsa Dzong

Chökhor Raptentse Dzong at Trongsa which was built in 1644, used to be the seat of power of the Wangchuck dynasty before it became rulers of Bhutan in 1907.  Traditionally the King of Bhutan first becomes the Trongsa Penlop (governor) before being named Crown Prince and eventually King. Built on a mountain spur high above the gorges of the Mangde Chhu, the dzong controlled east-west trade for centuries. The only road connecting eastern and western Bhutan (the precursor to the modern Lateral Road), passed through the courtyard of the dzong. At the command of the penlop the massive doors could be shut, dividing the country in two.

Higher yet on the mountainside is a watchtower, called "Ta Dzong"(watch tower), built to guard the dzong from enemies but now housing a museum and a chapel dedicated to Jigme Namgyal who was Trongsa Penlop from 1853 to 1870.

See also
Trongsa Dzong
Penlop of Trongsa
Trongsa Province
Bhutan Cultural Atlas

References

Populated places in Bhutan
Trongsa District